An election to the Neath Rural District Council in West Glamorgan, Wales was held in May 1949. It was preceded by the 1946 election, and followed by the 1952 election.

Overview of the results
The election resulted in relatively few changes in personnel as Labour comfortably upheld its majority.

Candidates
Seven Labour candidates were returned unopposed, including the father of the council, William Jones, who had represented Baglan Higher since 1919. Once again the party contested nearly all the seats on the authority.

The main opposition came from various Independent candidates and there were also a small number of Communist candidates in addition to David Davies who defended the seat he had won at the previous election.

Outcome
The main focus of interest was in the Coedffranc (Skewen) ward where two sitting councillors were defeated, namely the outgoing Labour chairman William Davies and long-serving Independent Mary Elizabeth (Bessie) Davies. Bessie Davies had originally been elected as a Labour councillor, before being elected as Independent Labour in 1937. In 1946 she stood as an Independent and a few weeks earlier had unsuccessfully sought election to Glamorgan County Council.

Ward Results

Baglan Higher (one seat)

Blaengwrach (one seats)

Blaenrhonddan (three seats)

Clyne (one seats)

Coedffranc (five seats)

Dyffryn Clydach (two seats)

Dulais Higher, Crynant Ward (one seat)

Dulais Higher, Onllwyn Ward (one seat)

Dulais Higher, Seven Sisters Ward (two seats)

Dulais Lower (one seat)

Michaelstone Higher (one seat)

Neath Higher (three seats)

Neath Lower (one seat)

Resolven, Cwmgwrach Ward (one seat)

Resolven, Resolven Ward (two seats)

Resolven, Rhigos Ward (two seats)

Resolven, Tonna Ward (one seat)

References

1949 Welsh local elections